Per Tore Woie (born 26 April 1969) is a Norwegian politician for the Liberal Party.

From 1992 to 1994 he was the leader of the Young Liberals of Norway, the youth wing of the Liberal Party.

He served as a State Secretary in the Office of the Prime Minister from 1997 to 2000, during the reign of Bondevik's First Cabinet. He has also worked as an adviser for the Liberal parliamentary caucus.

References

1969 births
Living people
Liberal Party (Norway) politicians
Norwegian state secretaries